Viktor Troicki (born 10 February 1986) is a Serbian former professional tennis player. He won his first ATP singles title at the 2010 Kremlin Cup, and his second and third ATP singles titles at the 2015 and 2016 Apia International Sydney. His biggest achievements were a career-high singles ranking of world No. 12 (achieved in June 2011) and winning the deciding rubber in Serbia's Davis Cup final against France in 2010. Since then, in every Davis Cup he attended, he contributed to Serbia reaching a quarterfinal or better. He is known for serving a 12-month ban for anti-doping rule violation in 2013–14 for missing a blood test.

By winning the inaugural ATP Cup in 2020, Troicki became the first player in tennis Open Era history to win all three major team competitions (Davis Cup in 2010 and World Team Cup in 2009 and 2012).

In December 2020, Troicki was appointed as captain of the Serbian team for the Davis Cup and ATP Cup.

Personal life
Troicki was born in Belgrade. His father Aleksandar is of Russian and mother Mila of Serbian origin. His paternal grandparents emigrated from Tver and Rostov-on-Don to Serbia in 1917. His paternal great-grandfather was Sergey Viktorovich Troitskiy, a Russian and Serbian Orthodox canon theologian and church historian, University Professor, author of several works on Orthodox Canon law, and Doctor of Canon law (1961).

Viktor married Aleksandra (née Đorđević) on 27 November 2016. They have two daughters, Irina and Darija.

In June 2020, Troicki and his then-pregnant wife tested positive for COVID-19.

Career

Early life
Troicki started playing tennis in his hometown of Belgrade at the age of five and began to show early promise to local coaches.

Juniors
As a junior, Troicki compiled a singles win–loss record of 68–31 (52–20 in doubles) and reached a combined ranking of No. 10 in the junior world rankings in October 2004.

Junior Grand Slam results – Singles:

Australian Open: –
French Open: 3R (2004)
Wimbledon: 2R (2004)
US Open: QF (2004)

Junior Grand Slam results – Doubles:

Australian Open: –
French Open: 1R (2004)
Wimbledon: F (2004)
US Open: SF (2004)

2003–2007
From 2003, he started playing Futures tournaments in Serbia and in 2004, won his first tennis tournament in Niš, thereafter his first Challenger tournament in Belgrade on 20 January 2005 versus Fabio Colangelo 6–2, 6–1 in the final.

He debuted on the ATP Tour in Tokyo, in October 2006, with a first round win over Fernando Vicente 6–7, 6–4, 6–2, before narrowly losing in the next round to then world No. 1 Roger Federer 6–7, 6–7.

In July 2007, as a qualifier in the Umag Croatian Open, he upset world No. 3 and fellow countryman Novak Djokovic in the second round 2–6, 6–4, 7–5, before eventually losing to Romanian Andrei Pavel in the semi-final.

2008: First ATP final

Troicki's first Grand Slam tournament came when he advanced as a qualifier in the Australian Open. Facing second seed Rafael Nadal in the first round, he played a tight match and held a set point in the first set, but lost 6–7, 5–7, 1–6.

He then represented Serbia in the Davis Cup against Russia, losing to Nikolay Davydenko 1–6, 6–1, 3–6, 6–1, 2–6, and defeating Dmitry Tursunov 7–6, 4–6, 6–3.

His next appearance was in the ATP Masters Series in Miami. He faced Andy Roddick in the second round. Troicki took the first set from Roddick, where he attempted an angled drop shot which Roddick returned it with an even more angled shot on his backhand. After this, it seemed to go downhill for Troicki, and he eventually lost 7–5, 2–6, 4–6. He then competed in the Torneo Godó, where he retired against Nicolás Almagro 2–6, ret. In his French Open debut, he lost in the opening round to Marc Gicquel 4–6, 3–6, 6–4, 5–7. He then competed in three straight tournaments, in the Queen's Club Championships losing to David Nalbandian in the second round, in the Ordina Open, losing to Guillermo Cañas in the quarterfinals, and in the Wimbledon Championships to Radek Štěpánek in the second round, after winning the first two sets 7–6, 7–6, 3–6, 1–6, 2–6.

Following Wimbledon, he competed in Croatia Open, losing to Carlos Moyá in the second round.

He then reached his first ATP final in Washington, D.C. at the Legg Mason Tennis Classic. Troicki defeated American Bobby Reynolds in the round of 16 to face Andy Roddick in the quarterfinals, where Troicki pulled off a major upset by defeating the defending 2007 champion and top-seeded American 0–6, 6–2, 6–4, to reach the semifinals, where Troicki defeated Igor Kunitsyn, before falling to the second seeded Juan Martín del Potro, 3–6, 3–6.

At the US Open, Troicki defeated Carsten Ball in the first round and Philipp Kohlschreiber in the second round, before losing to Rafael Nadal.

He then represented Serbia again in the Davis Cup against Slovakia, winning his only match against Lukáš Lacko 6–3, 6–4. He then competed in the Thailand Open, losing to Jürgen Melzer in the second round, in the Japan Open, losing to Andy Roddick, and the Kremlin Cup, losing to Mischa Zverev, both in the quarterfinals. He ended the year losing in the first round of the St. Petersburg and Paris Masters. He ended the year No. 56 in the world.

2009: Second ATP final & ARAG World Team Cup title

In January 2009, he lost in first round of the Qatar Open to Victor Hănescu and in the quarterfinals of Auckland Open to del Potro. In second round of the Australian Open, he was crushed by Tommy Robredo, 6–1, 6–3, 6–0. After that, Troicki made a good result in the Zagreb Indoors. He lost in the semifinals to Marin Čilić, 2–6, 5–7. Also in February, Troicki won the GEMAX Open, a Tretorn Series + Challenger held in Belgrade. In the final, he defeated Dominik Hrbatý in two sets.

In March 2009, Troicki played for the Serbian Davis Cup team, losing to David Ferrer 0–6, 3–6. He then competed in the next four Masters Series. In the BNP Paribas Open, he lost to David Nalbandian in the third round 4–6, 2–6. In the Miami Masters, he reached the fourth round before Andy Murray defeated him 6–1, 6–0. He then lost in the first round to Stan Wawrinka in the Monte Carlo Masters, and in the Rome Masters to Juan Martín del Potro in the second round. Viktor competed in the first tournament of his home nation in the Serbia Open, losing to compatriot Novak Djokovic. In the Madrid Masters, he lost to Nikolay Davydenko 2–6, 2–6, in the opener. He then represented Serbia in the ARAG World Team Cup, helping Serbia to win the title by beating Rainer Schüttler in the finals. In the French Open, he lost to fifth seed and eventual semifinalist Juan Martín del Potro in the second round 3–6, 5–7, 0–6, after defeating Łukasz Kubot in a tight five-setter 3–6, 6–3, 6–4, 6–7, 6–3.

Troicki was seeded for the first time in a Grand Slam tournament in Wimbledon Championships, as 30th seed, beating Brian Dabul in straight sets in the first, and winning a five-setter against Daniel Gimeno Traver in the second round. He lost to Andy Murray in the third round. He then competed in the German Open in Hamburg, losing to eventual finalist Paul-Henri Mathieu 0–3 ret., in the quarterfinals due to a foot injury he suffered when he fell hard in the start of the match. He then lost to Máximo González in Umag in the first round 4–6, 6–3, 6–7. He lost to Marc Gicquel in the second round of the Legg Mason Tennis Classic, 0–3 ret., due to his recurring foot injury suffered in Hamburg after receiving a bye in the first round. He then lost to Ferrer in the first round of the Rogers Masters 3–6, 0–6, and retired in the first round of the Western & Southern Financial Group Masters against Radek Štěpánek, 7–6, 1–0 ret. He had recorded five straight loses. Troicki competed in the US Open as 30th seed and claimed his first victory since Hamburg, defeating Peter Luczak 6–3, 6–3, 1–6, 2–6, 6–1, in the first round, but lost to Julien Benneteau in the following round. He then competed in the 2009 Davis Cup Play-offs, where he won both his matches against Uzbekistan.

Troicki reached another final in the Thailand Open. After defeating Thomaz Bellucci, 6–3, 7–6 in the round of 16, he then defeated eighth-seeded American John Isner 7–6, 6–2, in the quarterfinals. In his semifinal match, he went on to upset the defending 2008 Bangkok champion, 2008 Australian Open finalist, and top seed Jo-Wilfried Tsonga, 1–6, 6–2, 6–3 to reach his second ATP World Tour final to face the second seeded Gilles Simon. He lost 5–7, 3–6. He then competed in the 2009 China Open, where he lost in the second round to compatriot and eventual champion Novak Djokovic 3–6, 0–6. He then competed in the Shanghai ATP Masters 1000, where he lost to eighth seed Gilles Simon, 3–6, 4–6, after defeating Juan Mónaco 6–1, 6–2, in the first round. He was then upset by Karol Beck in the first round of the St. Petersburg Open, marking his 10th first-round loss in 25 tournaments. He then defeated Benjamin Becker 6–2, 7–6, before losing to Marin Čilić in the second round in a close three setter 6–7, 7–6, 6–7, in the Swiss Indoors. He played his last tournament in the BNP Paribas Masters, losing in the second round to Radek Štěpánek 4–6, 2–6, after defeating Paul-Henri Mathieu 7–6, 3–0 ret.

2010: First ATP and Davis Cup title

Troicki began the year by competing in the Qatar Open as the fifth seed, where he advanced to the semifinals after defeating Daniel Gimeno Traver 6–1, 7–5, Olivier Rochus 6–2, 6–2, and Łukasz Kubot 4–6, 6–4, 7–6, but lost to Rafael Nadal 1–6, 3–6. At the Medibank International Sydney, he beat Florent Serra 7–6, 6–4, in the first round and lost to Marcos Baghdatis in the second round 5–7, 3–6. He then lost in the second round of the Australian Open to Florian Mayer 6–4, 4–6, 6–7, 1–6. In the Zagreb Indoors, he was upset by Michael Berrer 4–6, 3–6, in the quarterfinals, after defeating Rainer Schüttler 6–3, 6–2, and Mikhail Kukushkin 7–5, 7–5. He then retired against Jürgen Melzer in the first round of the ABN AMRO World Tennis Tournament due to an elbow injury, being 3–6, 0–3 down. He then competed in the Dubai Tennis Championships, where he lost to compatriot Novak Djokovic in the second round. In the BNP Paribas Open, he lost in the fourth round to Tomáš Berdych 1–6, 3–6, having only played and won one game in the previous rounds, as he received a bye when his second round opponent Pablo Cuevas retired after one game and Nikolay Davydenko withdrew. In the Sony Ericsson Open, he lost to David Nalbandian in a close match 3–6, 6–4, 4–6, in the second round, after receiving a bye.

In the start of the clay season, Troicki competed in the Monte-Carlo Masters, losing to 12th seed Tommy Robredo in the second round, after defeating Łukasz Kubot 4–6, 6–2, 6–2. In October 2010, Viktor won his first ATP World Tour title in Moscow, defeating Marcos Baghdatis in the final 3–6, 6–4, 6–3. On his road to the title, he had also eliminated Dmitry Tursunov, Jo-Wilfried Tsonga, Horacio Zeballos, and Pablo Cuevas.

Troicki was part of Serbia's Davis Cup team that reached the final for the first time in their history in 2010. He was initially overlooked for the singles rubbers, but after compatriot Janko Tipsarević was beaten by Gaël Monfils in straight sets, Troicki was chosen to play the final singles rubber, as well as the doubles. With Serbia and France tied at 2–2, Troicki won the deciding match 6–2, 6–2, 6–3, against Michaël Llodra to clinch Serbia's first Davis Cup.

2011: Masters quarterfinal & reaching top 15

Troicki started 2011 in ATP Doha, where he lost to Roger Federer 2–6, 2–6, in the quarterfinals. Troicki advanced to the finals at ATP Sydney, where he beat Juan Ignacio Chela, Richard Gasquet, Florian Mayer, and in the final, lost to Gilles Simon 5–7, 6–7. Then at the Australian Open, he reached the third round for the first time, but retired against compatriot and eventual champion Novak Djokovic due to a stomach pain, after losing the first set 2–6. He next played at the ABN AMRO World Tennis Tournament and reached the semifinals without dropping a set, but fell to Robin Söderling 5–7, 4–6. He then fell to Philipp Kohlschreiber 1–6, 6–7, in the first round of the Dubai Tennis Championships. He represented Serbia in the first round of 2011 Davis Cup and won both his matches. He then played the Masters 1000 events, the BNP Paribas Open and the Sony Ericsson Open, falling to eventual champion Novak Djokovic in the fourth round in both tournaments. He then reached his first Masters 1000 quarterfinals at the Monte-Carlo Masters, losing to David Ferrer 3–6, 3–6, after his opponent in the previous round Tommy Robredo retired while leading the match 6–3, 1–2. He then suffered early losses in the Serbia Open, the Madrid Open, and the Italian Open. Troicki then represented Serbia in the World Team Cup, winning his matches against Mikhail Youzhny and Marcel Granollers, but losing his match to Florian Mayer. At the French Open, Troicki reached his first Grand Slam fourth round with wins over Julian Reister, Tobias Kamke, and Alexandr Dolgopolov. In the fourth round, he faced fourth seed Andy Murray, where he lost 6–4, 6–4, 3–6, 2–6, 5–7, despite serving for the match at 5–3 and 30–0 in the final set in a match that was played over two days. He then reached a new career high of no. 12.

At the Gerry Weber Open, Troicki defeated Mischa Zverev and Igor Andreev, before losing to Tomáš Berdych 6–7, 1–6, in the quarterfinal. Troicki reached the second round at Wimbledon, defeating Máximo González, 3–6, 6–0, 7–6, 6–3, before losing to Lu Yen-hsun 6–7, 4–6, 4–6. At the Legg Mason Tennis Classic, Troicki reached the quarterfinals, defeating Ryan Harrison and Kevin Anderson, but lost to John Isner 6–7, 6–3, 1–6. Next, Troicki played at the Rogers Cup, defeating Michael Yani 2–6, 6–3, 6–1, and John Isner 6–4, 3–6, 6–2, before losing to Gaël Monfils 6–3, 6–7, 6–7, in the third round.

In the US Open, he lost in the first round to Colombian Alejandro Falla. In Moscow in the first all-Serbian final in tennis history, Troicki lost to his good friend Janko Tipsarević, 4–6, 2–6.

2012: Second World Team Cup title

In 2012 with only two quarterfinal appearances, this season compared to previous seasons' individual results were sub-par, however his contributions to the Serbian national team did result in winning the World Team Cup along with a third consecutive quarterfinal appearance at the Davis Cup.

2013: Davis Cup runner-up & doping ban
Troicki won the Boodles Challenge, a warm-up to Wimbledon exhibition, defeating Robin Haase 7–5, 6–4 in the final. On 25 July 2013, Troicki was banned from playing tennis for 18 months, for failing to provide a blood sample at the Monte-Carlo Masters event. However, the suspension was reduced on appeal to one year, meaning he could play from 15 July 2014. After the Court of Arbitration for Sport announced their decision, Troicki, who had hoped his suspension would be overturned, said that he has "no idea about what to do now or where to go.  I hope somehow I will be able to fight back."

2014: Late return to form
After reaching the end of his drug ban, Troicki made his return to professional tennis at an ATP 250 event in Gstaad, receiving a wildcard into the main draw. He defeated 8th seed Dominic Thiem and Andrey Golubev en route to the quarterfinals, where he lost to fourth seeded Fernando Verdasco. He spent the next couple of months on the Challenger Tour, a period in which he won titles in Como, Italy and Banja Luka, Bosnia & Herzegovina. He returned to the ATP World Tour at the Shenzhen Open in China, coming through three rounds of qualifying and defeating world No. 5, David Ferrer, on his way to the quarterfinals, where he ultimately lost to Santiago Giraldo. He received a wildcard into the China Open in Beijing, and defeated Mikhail Youzhny in his opening match before losing to world No. 6, Tomáš Berdych. Troicki lost in the second round of qualifying at the Shanghai Masters, however qualified for the main draw in Erste Bank Open, and ultimately made it to the semifinals before losing to eventual champion Andy Murray in straight sets. His form after returning to the ATP Tour meant his ranking rose from 847th in the world to a year-end ranking just outside the top 100, finishing 102.

2015: Second career title & return to top 20

At the Apia International in Sydney in January 2015, Troicki defeated Gilles Müller 6–2, 6–4 in the semifinals en route to defeating Mikhail Kukushkin 6–2, 6–3 in the finals to capture his second career title. 
In the first ATP final in history featuring two qualifiers, Troicki dispatched Kukushkin in 64 minutes after breaking the Kazakh twice in each set. 
This victory brought him 38 positions up on ATP ladder to the position of 54 prior to the Australian Open. At Australian Open, he made it to third round before being eliminated by world No. 7, Tomas Berdych in straight sets. In March, Troicki defeated young Croatian prodigy Borna Ćorić in five epic sets in round one of Davis Cup; Serbia would go on to win & progress to the quarterfinals. After defeating Marin Čilić on 14 June, Troicki played in the finals of Stuttgart Mercedes Cup versus Rafael Nadal. Troicki played very well but Nadal won in straight sets, 7–6, 6–3. His US Open campaign opened with a straight sets victory over Frances Tiafoe and a 3–1 win over Rajeev Ram.

2016: Third career title & 250th victory

In January, Troicki collected this third career title as well as defending his Apia Sydney International title, defeating Grigor Dimitrov 2–6, 6–1, 7–6. It was his second encounter in as many weeks with Dimitrov who had gotten the better of him in three sets in the prior meeting. At the Australian Open, he equaled the previous years result making the third round. In February, he reached the final of the Sofia Open where he was defeated by Roberto Bautista Agut. At the French Open, he made it to fourth round where he lost to the defending champion Stan Wawrinka 7–6, 6–7, 6–3, 6–2 after three hours of play. Troicki lost in the second round of the Wimbledon Championships to Albert Ramos Viñolas. He was fined for the protracted verbal abuse of umpire Damiano Torella following Torella's overrule of a line call that resulted in a match point for Ramos Viñolas. Troicki lost the subsequent point and the match. At the Shanghai Masters, he finally defeated Nadal for the first time after six meetings.

2017: Second Masters quarterfinal & fourth Davis Cup semifinal
He reached the third round at the Australian Open, losing to US Open champion Stan Wawrinka in four sets, narrowly missing a tiebreaker in the fourth to push for a fifth set. In February, partnering Nenad Zimonjić he won his second ATP doubles title at Sofia Open. After that two solid wins at the first round of the Davis Cup ensured Serbia would reached the quarterfinals for the seventh time in eight years. At the Davis Cup quarterfinals in April, a straight sets victory over world No. 19 Pablo Carreño Busta saw him record a personal best serve of 233 km/h. A doubles victory with Nenad Zimonjić ensured a fourth Davis Cup semifinal for him & his country.

2018: Injuries and struggles with form 
In doubles, partnering Jan-Lennard Struff he reached the finals of Sydney International where they lost to Łukasz Kubot and Marcelo Melo. In singles, Troicki went 6–13 at the ATP Tour level in 2018. He suffered from a lower back injury during 2018 which limited his playing time. As a result, he fell out of the top 200.

2019: Some success during the grass season 
He reached the second round of Australian Open where he lost in 4 sets to the 14th seeded Stefanos Tsitsipas. During the year most of his success came only during the grass season. Viktor reached the finals of Surbiton Trophy where he lost to Daniel Evans, quarterfinals of Antalya Open where he lost to an eventual finalist Miomir Kecmanovic and round of 16 at Hall of Fame Open in Newport where he lost again to an eventual finalist, this time Alexander Bublik.

2020: Winning the inaugural ATP Cup and COVID-19
By winning the inaugural ATP Cup in 2020 with Serbia, Troicki became the first player in history to win all three major international team competitions (Davis Cup in 2010 and World Team Cup in 2009 and 2012). During summer, Troicki tested positive for COVID-19, which affected his preparations for the restart of the tennis season due to pandemic. At the end of the year, he became captain of the Serbia Davis Cup team.

2021: Retirement 
At the beginning of 2021 he qualified for the Australian Open main singles draw where he lost in the first round to Michael Mmoh in 5 tight sets. After failing to qualify for the main draw of Roland Garros he made a surprising run at Queen's Club by beating 7th seeded Lorenzo Sonego in straight sets before losing in the round of 16 to Frances Tiafoe. He announced that Wimbledon would be his last professional tournament before he retires. In the first round of qualifying he beat Christopher Eubanks before being defeated in the second round by Brandon Nakashima in three tight sets.

Career overview
Troicki was a solid all-court player, who has won more matches than he has lost on each surface. However, one factor that has kept him from more success is his poor record against top-10 players (65 losses vs 10 wins in his career).

Performance timelines

Singles
{|class=wikitable style=text-align:center;font-size:96%
!Tournament!!2006!!2007!!2008!!2009!!2010!!2011!!2012!!2013!!2014!!2015!!2016!!2017!!2018!!2019!!2020!!2021!!SR!!W–L!!Win%
|-
|colspan=20 align=left|Grand Slam tournaments
|-
|bgcolor=efefef align=left| Australian Open
|A
|Q3
|bgcolor=afeeee|1R
|bgcolor=afeeee|2R
|bgcolor=afeeee|2R
|bgcolor=afeeee|3R
|bgcolor=afeeee|2R
|bgcolor=afeeee|1R
|A
|bgcolor=afeeee|3R
|bgcolor=afeeee|3R
|bgcolor=afeeee|3R
|bgcolor=afeeee|2R
|bgcolor=afeeee|2R
|Q2
|bgcolor=afeeee|1R
|bgcolor=efefef|0 / 12
|bgcolor=efefef|13–12
|bgcolor=efefef|52%
|-
|bgcolor=efefef align=left| French Open
|Q2
|Q2
|bgcolor=afeeee|1R
|bgcolor=afeeee|2R
|bgcolor=afeeee|3R
|bgcolor=afeeee|4R
|bgcolor=afeeee|2R
|bgcolor=afeeee|4R
|A
|bgcolor=afeeee|2R
|bgcolor=afeeee|4R
|bgcolor=afeeee|2R
|A
|Q3
|Q1
|Q2
|bgcolor=efefef|0 / 9
|bgcolor=efefef|15–9
|bgcolor=efefef|63%
|-
|bgcolor=efefef align=left| Wimbledon
|Q1
|A
|bgcolor=afeeee|2R
|bgcolor=afeeee|3R
|bgcolor=afeeee|2R
|bgcolor=afeeee|2R
|bgcolor=afeeee|4R
|bgcolor=afeeee|3R
|A
|bgcolor=afeeee|4R
|bgcolor=afeeee|2R
|bgcolor=afeeee|1R
|A
|A
|style=color:#767676|NH
|Q2
|bgcolor=efefef|0 / 9
|bgcolor=efefef|14–9
|bgcolor=efefef|61%
|-
|bgcolor=efefef align=left| US Open
|Q2
|Q1
|bgcolor=afeeee|3R
|bgcolor=afeeee|2R
|bgcolor=afeeee|1R
|bgcolor=afeeee|1R
|bgcolor=afeeee|1R
|A
|A
|bgcolor=afeeee|3R
|bgcolor=afeeee|2R
|bgcolor=afeeee|3R
|bgcolor=afeeee|1R
|A
|A
|A
|bgcolor=efefef|0 / 9
|bgcolor=efefef|8–9
|bgcolor=efefef|47%
|-style=font-weight:bold;background:#efefef
|style=text-align:left|Win–loss
|0–0
|0–0
|3–4
|5–4
|4–4
|6–4
|5–4
|5–3
|0–0
|8–4
|7–4
|5–4
|1–2
|1–1
|0–0
|0–1
|0 / 39
|50–39
|56%
|-
|colspan=20 align=left|National representation
|-
|bgcolor=efefef align=left|Summer Olympics
|colspan=2 style=color:#767676|NH
|A
|colspan=3 style=color:#767676|NH
|bgcolor=afeeee|1R
|colspan=3 style=color:#767676|NH
|bgcolor=afeeee|1R
|colspan=4 style=color:#767676|NH
|A
|bgcolor=efefef|0 / 2
|bgcolor=efefef|0–2
|bgcolor=efefef|0%
|-
|bgcolor=efefef align=left|Davis Cup
|A
|A
|bgcolor=afeeee|1R
|bgcolor=afeeee|1R
|bgcolor=lime|W
|bgcolor=yellow|SF
|bgcolor=ffebcd|QF
|bgcolor=thistle|F
|A
|bgcolor=ffebcd|QF
|bgcolor=ffebcd|QF
|bgcolor=yellow|SF
|A
|bgcolor=ffebcd|QF
|style=color:#767676|NH
|A
|bgcolor=efefef|1 / 10
|bgcolor=efefef|17–11
|bgcolor=efefef|61%
|-
|colspan=20 align=left|ATP Masters 1000
|-
|bgcolor=efefef align=left|Indian Wells Masters
|A
|bgcolor=afeeee|1R
|A
|bgcolor=afeeee|3R
|bgcolor=afeeee|4R
|bgcolor=afeeee|4R
|bgcolor=afeeee|2R
|bgcolor=afeeee|1R
|A
|bgcolor=afeeee|1R
|bgcolor=afeeee|2R
|bgcolor=afeeee|1R
|bgcolor=afeeee|1R
|A
|style=color:#767676|NH
|A
|bgcolor=efefef|0 / 10
|bgcolor=efefef|5–10
|bgcolor=efefef|33%
|-
|bgcolor=efefef align=left|Miami Open
|A
|Q1
|bgcolor=afeeee|2R
|bgcolor=afeeee|4R
|bgcolor=afeeee|2R
|bgcolor=afeeee|4R
|bgcolor=afeeee|3R
|bgcolor=afeeee|2R
|A
|bgcolor=afeeee|3R
|bgcolor=afeeee|3R
|bgcolor=afeeee|2R
|bgcolor=afeeee|1R
|A
|style=color:#767676|NH
|A
|bgcolor=efefef|0 / 10
|bgcolor=efefef|11–10
|bgcolor=efefef|52%
|-
|bgcolor=efefef align=left|Monte-Carlo Masters
|A
|A
|A
|bgcolor=afeeee|1R
|bgcolor=afeeee|2R
|bgcolor=ffebcd|QF
|bgcolor=afeeee|2R
|bgcolor=afeeee|1R
|A
|bgcolor=afeeee|2R
|bgcolor=afeeee|1R
|bgcolor=afeeee|1R
|Q1
|A
|style=color:#767676|NH
|A
|bgcolor=efefef|0 / 8
|bgcolor=efefef|6–8
|bgcolor=efefef|43%
|-
|bgcolor=efefef align=left|Madrid Open
|A
|A
|A
|bgcolor=afeeee|1R
|bgcolor=afeeee|1R
|bgcolor=afeeee|1R
|bgcolor=afeeee|2R
|bgcolor=afeeee|2R
|A
|bgcolor=afeeee|1R
|bgcolor=afeeee|1R
|A
|Q2
|A
|style=color:#767676|NH
|A
|bgcolor=efefef|0 / 7
|bgcolor=efefef|2–7
|bgcolor=efefef|22%
|-
|bgcolor=efefef align=left|Italian Open
|A
|A
|A
|bgcolor=afeeee|2R
|bgcolor=afeeee|2R
|bgcolor=afeeee|2R
|bgcolor=afeeee|2R
|bgcolor=afeeee|2R
|A
|bgcolor=afeeee|3R
|bgcolor=afeeee|2R
|bgcolor=afeeee|2R
|Q2
|A
|A
|A
|bgcolor=efefef|0 / 8
|bgcolor=efefef|9–8
|bgcolor=efefef|53%
|-
|bgcolor=efefef align=left|Canadian Open
|Q1
|A
|A
|bgcolor=afeeee|1R
|bgcolor=afeeee|2R
|bgcolor=afeeee|3R
|bgcolor=afeeee|2R
|A
|A
|bgcolor=afeeee|1R
|bgcolor=afeeee|1R
|bgcolor=afeeee|1R
|A
|Q1
|style=color:#767676|NH
|A
|bgcolor=efefef|0 / 7
|bgcolor=efefef|4–7
|bgcolor=efefef|36%
|-
|bgcolor=efefef align=left|Cincinnati Masters
|Q2
|A
|A
|bgcolor=afeeee|1R
|bgcolor=afeeee|2R
|bgcolor=afeeee|1R
|bgcolor=afeeee|3R
|A
|A
|bgcolor=afeeee|1R
|bgcolor=afeeee|1R
|bgcolor=afeeee|1R
|A
|A
|A
|A
|bgcolor=efefef|0 / 7
|bgcolor=efefef|3–7
|bgcolor=efefef|30%
|-
|bgcolor=efefef align=left|Shanghai Masters
|A
|A
|A
|bgcolor=afeeee|2R
|A
|bgcolor=afeeee|1R
|bgcolor=afeeee|2R
|A
|Q2
|bgcolor=afeeee|2R
|bgcolor=afeeee|3R
|bgcolor=ffebcd|QF
|A
|Q1
|colspan=2 style=color:#767676|NH
|bgcolor=efefef|0 / 6
|bgcolor=efefef|8–6
|bgcolor=efefef|57%
|-
|bgcolor=efefef align=left|Paris Masters
|A
|A
|bgcolor=afeeee|1R
|bgcolor=afeeee|2R
|A
|bgcolor=afeeee|3R
|bgcolor=afeeee|1R
|A
|A
|bgcolor=afeeee|3R
|bgcolor=afeeee|2R
|bgcolor=afeeee|1R
|A
|A
|A
|A
|bgcolor=efefef|0 / 7
|bgcolor=efefef|5–7
|bgcolor=efefef|42%
|-style=font-weight:bold;background:#efefef
|style=text-align:left|Win–loss
|0–0
|0–1
|1–2
|8–9
|5–7
|11–9
|8–9
|3–5
|0–0
|7–9
|5–9
|5–8
|0–2
|0–0
|0–0
|0–0
|0 / 70
|53–70
|43%
|-
| colspan=20 style=text-align:left |Career statistics
|-style=font-weight:bold;background:#efefef
| ||2006||2007||2008||2009||2010||2011||2012||2013||2014||2015||2016||2017||2018||2019||2020||2021|| colspan="3" |Career
|-bgcolor=efefef 
|align=left|Tournaments
|1
|7
|19
|27
|26
|24
|27
|18
|4
|28
|29
|28
|13
|4
|3
|4
|colspan=3|262
|-style=font-weight:bold;background:#efefef
|style=text-align:left|Titles 
|0
|0
|0
|0
|1
|0
|0
|0
|0
|1
|1
|0
|0
|0
|0
|0
|colspan=3|Career total: 3
|-style=font-weight:bold;background:#efefef
|style=text-align:left|Finals
|0
|0
|1
|1
|1
|2
|0
|0
|0
|2
|2
|0
|0
|0
|0
|0
|colspan=3|Career total: 9
|-style=font-weight:bold;background:#efefef
|style=text-align:left|Overall win–loss
|1–1
|5–7
|21–20
|32–29
|37–30
|40–26
|26–29
|19–19
|8–4
|35–28
|34–29
|24–28
|6–13
|4–4
|1–2
|1–4
|3 / 262
|294–273
|
|-style=font-weight:bold;background:#efefef
|style=text-align:left|Win %
|
|
|
|
|
|
|
|
|
|
|
|
|
|
|
|
|colspan=3| Career total: 
|-bgcolor=efefef 
|align=left|Year-end ranking
|207
|122
|57
|29
|28
|22
|38
|74
|102
|22
|29
|55
|215
|158
|201
|225
|colspan=3|{{Tooltip|$9,265,938 | Career Prize Money – Singles & Doubles combined}}
|}

Doubles

ATP career finals
Singles: 9 (3 titles, 6 runner-ups)

Doubles: 4 (2 titles, 2 runner-ups)

Team competition finals: 4 (4–0)

Challenger and Futures finals
Singles: 12 (7–5)

Doubles: 8 (3–5)

Junior Grand Slam finals
Doubles: 1 (1 runner-up)

Exhibitions
Tournament finals
Singles

 Record against top-10 players 
Troicki's record against players who have been ranked in the top 10. Active players are in boldface:

Wins over top 10 players
He has a 10–65 (.133) record against players who were, at the time the match was played, ranked in the top 10.

Records
• Record of consecutive five-set Grand Slam matches'''

See also

 Serbia Davis Cup team
 List of male tennis players

Notes

References

External links

  
 
 
 

1986 births
Living people
Tennis players from Belgrade
Serbian male tennis players
Olympic tennis players of Serbia
Serbian people of Russian descent
Serbian sportspeople in doping cases
Serbia and Montenegro male tennis players
Tennis players at the 2012 Summer Olympics
Tennis players at the 2016 Summer Olympics
Doping cases in tennis